Yonah Martin (née Kim; born April 11, 1965) is a Conservative Canadian Senator from British Columbia. She was appointed by Prime Minister Stephen Harper in January 2009, and is the first Canadian of Korean descent to serve in the Senate of Canada and the first Korean-Canadian Parliamentarian in Canadian history.

She is currently the Deputy Leader of the Opposition in the Senate. She served as Deputy Whip of the Government in the Senate, from May 2011 to August 2013; and has been Co-Chair of the Canada Korea Inter-Parliamentary Friendship Group since 2009.

Career 
Born in Seoul, South Korea, Martin immigrated to Canada with her family in 1972, settling in Vancouver. With deep roots in both Korean and Canadian heritage, she became a community activist and voice of authority for Canadians of Korean descent. Inspired by her Canadian-born daughter and immigrant parents, and with a desire to "bridge communities", she co-founded C3 Society in 2003.

Martin graduated from the University of British Columbia in 1987, and earned a Master of Education in 1996. She spent 21 years as an educator in Abbotsford, Burnaby and Coquitlam school districts until her appointment to the Senate.

On June 19, 2013, her Bill S-213 (Korean War Veterans Day Act), which enacts July 27 as a day of remembrance for Veterans of the Korean War, received Royal Assent.

Martin called for the resignation of her Senatorial colleagues Patrick Brazeau, Pamela Wallin and Mike Duffy following the Canadian Senate Expense Scandal. The text of Martin's motion would have allowed the impugned senators to keep their Senate life, health and dental insurance.

Martin has received the Spirit of Community award for Cultural Harmony (2004), the Order of Korea Moran Medal from the Government of the Republic of Korea (2009) and the Queen's Diamond Jubilee Medal (2012).

Personal life 
She has been married to Doug Martin since 1990, and they have a daughter.

Electoral record
Yonah Martin stood for election to the House of Commons of Canada as a candidate in the riding of New Westminster—Coquitlam.

References

External links
 Yonah Martin
 

1965 births
Living people
British Columbia candidates for Member of Parliament
Conservative Party of Canada candidates for the Canadian House of Commons
Conservative Party of Canada senators
Canadian senators from British Columbia
Canadian politicians of Korean descent
Women members of the Senate of Canada
People from Seoul
Politicians from Vancouver
South Korean emigrants to Canada
Women in British Columbia politics
Moran Medals of the Order of Civil Merit (Korea)
21st-century Canadian women politicians